Captain Jack may refer to:

People
 Calico Jack (1683–1720), a pirate in the 18th century
 Captain Jack (Hawaiian) (died 1831), Naihekukui, commander of Kamehameha's fleet and father of Kalama
 Captain Jack (fl. 1830s on), Kaurna man in colonial Adelaide, also known as Kadlitpinna
 Captain Jack (c. 1837–1873), Kintpuash, leader of the Modoc tribe
 Captain Jack, Nicaagat, leader of the Utes of Colorado during the Battle of Milk Creek
 John Wallace Crawford aka "Captain Jack" (1847–1917), American Civil War veteran & Old West scout, poet of western lore
 Stephen Jackson, an American professional basketball player nicknamed "Captain Jack"

In music
 Captain Jack (band), a German Eurodance act
 "Captain Jack" (Captain Jack song), a song by Captain Jack from The Mission
 "Captain Jack" (Billy Joel song), a song by Billy Joel

In fiction
 Captain Jack (1996 film), a 1996 film written by Scott Wiper
 Captain Jack (film), a 1999 film starring Bob Hoskins
 Jack Harkness, a central character in the TV series Torchwood and Doctor Who
 Captain Jack Harkness, a guest character in Torchwood after whom the regular character was named
"Captain Jack Harkness" (Torchwood episode), an episode of Torchwood in which the guest character appears
Captain Jack Sparrow, the central character in the Pirates of the Caribbean films
Captain Jack Absolute, a character in the 1775 play The Rivals
 "Captain Jack", an episode of TV series Leave It to Beaver (1957), and the name of an alligator in that episode
 Captain Jack, a character in The Office episode "Booze Cruise"
 Captain Jack, a character in the Babylon 5 episode "Racing Mars"
 Captain Jack, an alligator in The Simpsons episode "Kill the Alligator and Run"
The Adventures of Captain Jack, a comic book series by Mike Kazaleh published by Fantagraphics 1986–1989
 Captain Jack Aubrey, a fictional character in the Aubrey–Maturin novels by Patrick O'Brian

See also
"Jack Sparrow" (song), a 2011 song by The Lonely Island about Captain Jack Sparrow

Title and name disambiguation pages